Call Me Miss... (stylized as Call me Miss...) is the sixth studio album by Japanese recording artist Crystal Kay. This was released just two weeks after her previous single "Kirakuni / Together" and in two different versions: a regular CD only edition and a limited CD+DVD edition that comes with an orchestra version of "Kiss" as well as a DVD of the PVs and live performances of two of Kay's big hits, "Koi ni Ochitara" and "Two As One" (with both these reaching #2 on the Oricon weekly charts).

CD track listing

DVD track listing

Charts

Release history

External links 
 Crystal Kay — official website

2006 albums
Crystal Kay albums
Epic Records albums